The 2019 Knowsley Metropolitan Borough Council election took place on 2 May 2019 to elect members of Knowsley Metropolitan Borough Council in England. This election was held on the same day as other local elections.

After the election, the composition of the council was:

Election results

Overall election result
Overall result compared with 2018.

Ward results

Cherryfield

Halewood North

Halewood South

Northwood

Page Moss

Prescot North

Prescot South

Roby

Shevington

St Gabriels

St Michaels

Stockbridge

Swanside

Whiston and Cronton

Whitefield

References

2019 English local elections
2019
2010s in Merseyside
May 2019 events in the United Kingdom